Kim Hee-Tae (born May 8, 1977), better known by his English-language name Sam Kim is a South Korean chef and television personality. He is currently a cast member in the variety show Real Men and Please Take Care of My Refrigerator. He also hosted Sam and Raymon Cooking Time from 2011 to 2012.

References

1977 births
Living people
South Korean television chefs
Chefs of Italian cuisine
South Korean chefs